MFK Nová Dubnica is a Slovak football team, based in the town of Nová Dubnica.

Colours
Club colours are red and white.

External links
Official club website 
Futbalnet profile 
MFK Nová Dubnica at Nová Dubnica portal

References

Football clubs in Slovakia
Association football clubs established in 1956